Larry Barretta is a former American football quarterback who played three seasons in the Arena Football League with the Pittsburgh Gladiators and Orlando Predators. He played college football at Lycoming College.

References

External links
Just Sports Stats

Living people
Year of birth missing (living people)
American football quarterbacks
Lycoming Warriors football players
Pittsburgh Gladiators players
Orlando Predators players